Yugra is a rural locality (a village) in Tarnogskoye Rural Settlement, Tarnogsky District, Vologda Oblast, Russia. The population was 29 as of 2002.

Geography 
Yugra is located 16 km southwest of Tarnogsky Gorodok (the district's administrative centre) by road. Stary Dvor is the nearest rural locality.

References 

Rural localities in Tarnogsky District